The Kuna Formation is a geologic formation in Alaska. It preserves fossils dating back to the Carboniferous period.

See also

 List of fossiliferous stratigraphic units in Alaska
 Paleontology in Alaska

References
 

Carboniferous Alaska